Gadzhiyev, Gadzhiev or Hajiyev (Azerbaijani: Hacıyev, Russian: Гаджиев) is an Asian masculine surname, its feminine counterpart is Gadzhiyeva, Gadzhieva or Hajiyeva. It may refer to

Gadzhiyev
Abdulkhakim Gadzhiyev (born 1966), Russian politician
Daniyal Gadzhiyev (born 1986), Kazakhstani born-Dagestani wrestler
Gadzhi Gadzhiyev (born 1945), Russian football manager 
Gadzhi Gadzhiyev (footballer) (born 1991), Russian football midfplayerileder
Gaidar Gadzhiyev (1953–2001), Russian major general of the Strategic Missile Troops
Magomedmurad Gadzhiev (born 1988), Russian-Polish freestyle wrestler
Magomedemin Gadzhiev (born 1961), Russian politician
Magomed Gadzhiyev (born 1965),  Russian politician, State Duma Deputy of the Federal Assembly of the Russian Federation of the IV, V, VI and VII convocations
Magomet Gadzhiyev (1907–1942), Soviet Navy submarine commander
Makhach Gadzhiyev (born 1987), Russian football player
Rustam Gadzhiyev (born 1978), Russian football player

Gadzhiev
Murad Gadzhiev (born 1961), Russian politician
Ruslan Gadzhiev (born 1978), Russian politician

Hacıyeva
Nergiz Hacıyeva (born 1991), Azerbaijani women's footballer

Hajiyev
Aftandil Hajiyev (born 1981), Azerbaijani footballer
Alif Hajiyev (1953–1992), Azerbaijani military officer
Bakhtiyar Hajiyev (born c. 1982), Azerbaijani activist
Boyukagha Hajiyev (born 1958), Azerbaijani footballer and manager
Diana Hajiyeva (born 1989), Azerbaijani singer and songwriter
Ilkin Hajiyev (born 1983), Azerbaijani futsal player
Ismayil Hajiyev (born 1949), Azerbaijani-Canadian composer and conductor
Jahangir Hajiyev, Azerbaijani banker
Jovdat Hajiyev (1917–2002), Azerbaijani composer
Nizami Hajiyev (born 1988), Azerbaijani footballer
Rafig Hajiyev (born 1946), Azerbaijani wrestler 
Rauf Hajiyev (1922–1995), Azerbaijani composer and politician
Rizvan Gadzhiev (born 1987), freestyle wrestler from Belarus
Zamira Hajiyeva, first recipient of an Unexplained Wealth Order, under a UK anti-corruption law, wife of Jahangir
Zulfi Hajiyev (1935–1991), Azerbaijani politician

Azerbaijani-language surnames